Bygg Mats Birger Mabergs (born ) is a Swedish curler and curling coach.

As a coach of Swedish wheelchair curling team he participated in 2014 Winter Paralympics.

Teams

Men's

Mixed

Record as a coach of national teams

References

External links

Mabergs Curlingblogg - En curlingblogg med trevliga curlinghändelser i familjen Mabergs närhet :))
Lag – Malung Curling Club

Living people
1962 births
Swedish male curlers
Swedish curling coaches
Place of birth missing (living people)